Pneumocystis wakefieldiae is a parasitic fungus isolated from rats.

References

Further reading

External links

Ascomycota
Fungi described in 2004
Parasitic fungi